The Kharasan mine is a large in-situ leaching mine located in the southern part of Kazakhstan in South Kazakhstan Region. Kharasan represents one of the largest uranium reserves in Kazakhstan having estimated reserves of 59.3 million tonnes of ore grading 0.074% uranium.

See also 
Uranium mining in Kazakhstan

References 

Uranium mines in Kazakhstan
Turkistan Region